Harold Goodman Shoemaker (1 September 1892 – 23 October 1918) was an American pursuit pilot and a flying ace in World War I.

Biography
Shoemaker was a First Lieutenant in the Air Service, United States Army.  He was attached to the Royal Air Force in the summer of 1918. He was one of the first American pilots to reach England.  He was assigned to 74 Squadron and was credited with five air victories by the end of August. He returned to the AS, USA and was assigned to the 17th Aero Squadron, flying Sopwith Camels on 29 August.

On 5 October 1918, Shoemaker collided in mid-air with another pilot over enemy territory, being reported missing in action. The International Red Cross later reported that Shoemaker died in a prisoner of war camp in Germany. He was buried in the Somme American Cemetery and Memorial in the village of Bony, France.

See also
 List of World War I flying aces from the United States

References

External links
Harold Goodman Shoemaker at HonorStates.org

1892 births
1910s missing person cases
1918 deaths
American military personnel killed in World War I
American prisoners of war in World War I
American World War I flying aces
Missing in action of World War I
World War I prisoners of war held by Germany